The 1993 NASCAR Winston Cup Series was the 45th season of professional stock car racing in the United States and the 22nd modern-era Cup season. The season began on February 7 and ended on November 14. Dale Earnhardt of Richard Childress Racing won the title, the sixth of his career.

1993 was marked by the deaths of two Winston Cup drivers, though neither were on-track in any form.  1992 Champion Alan Kulwicki was killed on April 1 in a plane crash near Blountville, Tennessee.  He was travelling to Bristol International Raceway in a corporate jet belonging to his sponsor, Hooters. Davey Allison died on July 13, a day after a helicopter crash at Talladega Superspeedway left him with a severe head trauma. The accidents robbed the sport two of its brightest young stars and denied Kulwicki the chance to defend his 1992 title.

The season also saw the introduction of electronic scoring, giving instantaneous interval numbers.

This was the first season without NASCAR legend Richard Petty since 1957.

Teams and drivers

Complete schedule

Limited schedule

Schedule

Race scheduled for March 14, but postponed due to the 1993 Storm of the Century.

Races

Busch Clash 

The Busch Clash, an invitational event for all pole winners of the previous season, was held February 7 at Daytona International Speedway. Ernie Irvan drew the pole.

Top ten results

 3-Dale Earnhardt
 25-Ken Schrader
 4-Ernie Irvan
 6-Mark Martin
 5-Ricky Rudd
 28-Davey Allison
 42-Kyle Petty
 8-Sterling Marlin
 11-Bill Elliott
 7-Alan Kulwicki

Gatorade 125s 

The Gatorade 125s, qualifying races for the Daytona 500, were held February 11 at Daytona International Speedway. Kyle Petty and Dale Jarrett won the poles for both races, respectively.

Race one: top ten results

 24-Jeff Gordon
 11-Bill Elliott
 42-Kyle Petty
 25-Ken Schrader
 90-Bobby Hillin Jr.
 28-Davey Allison
 83-Lake Speed
 44-Rick Wilson
 9-Chad Little
 14-Terry Labonte

Race two: top ten results

 3-Dale Earnhardt
 15-Geoff Bodine
 18-Dale Jarrett
 4-Ernie Irvan
 7-Alan Kulwicki
 5-Ricky Rudd
 8-Sterling Marlin
 41-Phil Parsons
 27-Hut Stricklin
 26-Brett Bodine

With the win, Jeff Gordon became the first rookie ever to win a qualifying race, only to be matched by Denny Hamlin in 2006. In the second race, defending Indy 500 winner Al Unser Jr. (entering his first and only NASCAR race) wrecked on lap 10, but still managed to qualify for the Daytona 500 based on speed.

Daytona 500 by STP 

The 1993 Daytona 500 by STP was held February 14 at Daytona International Speedway. Kyle Petty's #42 car won the pole, putting a Petty on the Daytona 500 pole for the first time since 1966, and only the second time ever. Kyle was also the first North Carolina driver to win the 500 pole since Benny Parsons in 1982. His father Richard waved the green flag in the first Winston Cup race held since his retirement.

Top ten results

 18-Dale Jarrett
 3-Dale Earnhardt
 15-Geoff Bodine
 27-Hut Stricklin
 24-Jeff Gordon*
 6-Mark Martin
 21-Morgan Shepherd
 25-Ken Schrader
 8-Sterling Marlin
 16-Wally Dallenbach Jr.

Failed to qualify: 85-Dorsey Schroeder, 48-James Hylton, 45-Rich Bickle, 29-Kerry Teague, 0-Delma Cowart, 77-Mike Potter, 73-Stanley Smith, 99-Brad Teague, 31-Steve Kinser, 51-Jeff Purvis, 50-A. J. Foyt, 23-Eddie Bierschwale, and 95-Ken Ragan

The race was marked by a grinding crash involving Rusty Wallace who was spun out by Michael Waltrip on the backstretch and sent Wallace on a series of horrific barrel rolls in the grass. He was uninjured although.
Jeff Gordon made his first Daytona 500 start on his first Winston Cup full season. He became the first rookie ever to win one of the qualifying races. He also led the 1st lap and finished 5th, which is considered one of the most successful Daytona 500 debuts ever.
The "Dale and Dale Show" commenced as Jarrett passed Earnhardt in the tri-oval as they took the white flag. As the leaders exited Turn 2, the CBS Sports producers came on the headsets of Ken Squier, Neil Bonnett, and Ned Jarrett, telling Ned to "call his son home", leading to an emotional finish.
This Daytona 500 was the first not to feature Richard Petty as a driver in the starting lineup since 1965.
Last career pole for Kyle Petty.

GM Goodwrench 500 

The GM Goodwrench 500 was held on February 28 at North Carolina Speedway. Mark Martin won the pole.

Top ten results

 2-Rusty Wallace
 3-Dale Earnhardt
 4-Ernie Irvan
 7-Alan Kulwicki
 6-Mark Martin
 18-Dale Jarrett
 55-Ted Musgrave
 41-Phil Parsons
 15-Geoff Bodine, 1 lap down
 14-Terry Labonte, 1 lap down

Failed to qualify: 49-Stanley Smith

Pontiac Excitement 400 

The Pontiac Excitement 400 was held March 7 at Richmond International Raceway. Ken Schrader won the pole.

Top ten results

 28-Davey Allison
 2-Rusty Wallace
 7-Alan Kulwicki
 18-Dale Jarrett
 42-Kyle Petty
 24-Jeff Gordon
 6-Mark Martin
 17-Darrell Waltrip
 33-Harry Gant
 3-Dale Earnhardt, 1 lap down

Failed to qualify: 45-Rich Bickle

This would be Davey Allison's final Winston Cup win.
Last career Top 5 for Alan Kulwicki.

Motorcraft Quality Parts 500 

The Motorcraft Quality Parts 500 was scheduled for March 14 at Atlanta Motor Speedway. However, it was postponed and moved to March 20 in the aftermath of the 1993 Storm of the Century. Rusty Wallace won the pole.

Top ten results

 21-Morgan Shepherd
 4-Ernie Irvan
 2-Rusty Wallace
 24-Jeff Gordon, 1 lap down
 5-Ricky Rudd, 1 lap down
 15-Geoff Bodine, 1 lap down
 42-Kyle Petty, 1 lap down
 26-Brett Bodine, 1 lap down
 11-Bill Elliott, 2 laps down
 12-Jimmy Spencer, 3 laps down

Failed to qualify: 45-Rich Bickle, 84-Rick Crawford, 48-James Hylton, 61-Rick Carelli

 Jeff Gordon appeared headed to his first Winston Cup win until during the last pit stop he went past his pit box line and had to back up losing too much time, then scraping the wall trying to stay ahead of Rusty Wallace.
 This was the last time until the 2018 Martinsville spring race that a race in the NASCAR's premier series was postponed due to snow.

TranSouth 500 

The TranSouth 500 was held March 28 at Darlington Raceway. Qualifying was rained out and the starting grid was lined up based on points. Dale Earnhardt started from the pole.

Top ten results

 3-Dale Earnhardt
 6-Mark Martin
 18-Dale Jarrett
 25-Ken Schrader
 2-Rusty Wallace, 1 lap down
 7-Alan Kulwicki, 1 lap down
 42-Kyle Petty, 1 lap down
 15-Geoff Bodine, 1 lap down
 14-Terry Labonte, 1 lap down
 21-Morgan Shepherd, 2 laps down

Failed to qualify: 62-John McFadden

 This was the last time the spring race was 500 miles until the track went to one race a year for the top division of NASCAR in 2005. The 400 mile spring race would return in 2021
 This was Alan Kulwicki's final NASCAR race, as four days later, he was fatally injured in a plane crash.

Food City 500 

The Food City 500 was held April 4 at Bristol International Raceway. Rusty Wallace won the pole.

Top ten results

 2-Rusty Wallace
 3-Dale Earnhardt
 42-Kyle Petty
 12-Jimmy Spencer
 28-Davey Allison
 17-Darrell Waltrip
 21-Morgan Shepherd, 1 lap down
 6-Mark Martin, 2 laps down
 26-Brett Bodine, 3 laps down
 1-Rick Mast, 3 laps down

Failed to qualify: 48-James Hylton

Withdrawn: 7-Alan Kulwicki

 On the evening of April 1st, defending Cup champion Alan Kulwicki and three Hooters executives were killed in a plane crash on their way to this race.
 After being spun out by Bobby Hillin Jr., Dale Jarrett threw his helmet at the #90 car during the caution period that ran from lap 210 to 216.
 After taking the checkered flag, Rusty Wallace made a Polish Victory Lap in memory of the deceased Winston Cup Champion Alan Kulwicki who made it famous.
 In what would have been the big story prior to the loss of Alan Kulwicki; this race marked the first day race at Bristol since switching from asphalt to its present concrete surface.

First Union 400 

The First Union 400 was held April 18 at North Wilkesboro Speedway. Brett Bodine won the pole.

Top ten results

 2-Rusty Wallace
 42-Kyle Petty
 25-Ken Schrader
 28-Davey Allison
 17-Darrell Waltrip
 14-Terry Labonte
 5-Ricky Rudd
 21-Morgan Shepherd
 8-Sterling Marlin
 11-Bill Elliott, 2 laps down

Failed to qualify: 49-Stanley Smith

Jimmy Hensley was named the interim substitute driver for the #7 car, filling the seat formerly held by the late Alan Kulwicki. Sponsor Hooters pulled out of the team, but Bojangles stepped in to sponsor the car, promoting the Easter Seals charity on the car's hood.
The biggest news story of the week leading up to the race was the official announcement of the inaugural Brickyard 400, scheduled for August 6, 1994.

Hanes 500 

The Hanes 500 was held April 25 at Martinsville Speedway. Geoff Bodine won the pole.

Top ten results

 2-Rusty Wallace
 28-Davey Allison
 18-Dale Jarrett
 17-Darrell Waltrip
 42-Kyle Petty, 1 lap down
 15-Geoff Bodine, 3 laps down
 26-Brett Bodine, 3 laps down
 24-Jeff Gordon, 3 laps down
 14-Terry Labonte, 3 laps down
 6-Mark Martin, 4 laps down

Failed to qualify: 52-Jimmy Means, 9-P. J. Jones

This was Rusty Wallace's 3rd consecutive victory.

Winston 500 

The Winston 500 was held May 2 at Talladega Superspeedway. Dale Earnhardt won the pole.

Top ten results

 4-Ernie Irvan
 12-Jimmy Spencer
 18-Dale Jarrett
 3-Dale Earnhardt
 20-Joe Ruttman
 2-Rusty Wallace
 28-Davey Allison
 98-Derrike Cope
 7-Jimmy Hensley
 30-Michael Waltrip

Failed to qualify: 9-P. J. Jones, 48-James Hylton, 0-Delma Cowart, 31-Steve Kinser, 62-Ben Hess, 71-Dave Marcis, 73-Phil Barkdoll, 65-Jerry O'Neil, 49-Stanley Smith

 On the final lap approaching the checkered flag, Rusty Wallace was spun and flipped end over end.
 This race would be the last victory for Ernie Irvan behind the wheel of the #4 Morgan-McClure Motorsports Kodak Film Chevrolet Lumina before his departure later that season.

Save Mart Supermarkets 300K 

The Save Mart Supermarkets 300K was held May 16 at Sears Point Raceway. Dale Earnhardt won the pole.

Top ten results

 15-Geoff Bodine
 4-Ernie Irvan
 5-Ricky Rudd
 25-Ken Schrader
 42-Kyle Petty
 3-Dale Earnhardt
 16-Wally Dallenbach Jr.
 44-Rick Wilson
 14-Terry Labonte
 27-Hut Stricklin

Failed to qualify: 51-Rick Scribner, 09-R. K. Smith, 48-Jack Sellers

This was the last win for the famous Bud Moore team.
Geoff Bodine celebrated the win at the same time as he was finalizing a deal to purchase the assets to the late Alan Kulwicki's #7 team.

The Winston Open 
The Winston Open, a 50 lap last chance race to qualify for The Winston, was held on May 22nd, 1993 at Charlotte Motor Speedway. Jeff Gordon won the pole. The top four finishers would qualify for The Winston later that night.

Top five results

 8-Sterling Marlin
 25-Ken Schrader
 26-Brett Bodine
 30-Michael Waltrip
 1-Rick Mast

Jeff Gordon was dominating the race leading the first 22 laps until he crashed out of the race on the 23rd lap.

The Winston 
The 1993 edition of The Winston, took place on May 22, 1993. Ernie Irvan won the pole.

Criteria to qualify 
 All active 1992 and 1993 race winning drivers.
 All active 1992 and 1993 race winning car owners.
 All active former Winston Cup Champions.
 Top 4 finishers from The Winston Open

Top ten results

 3-Dale Earnhardt
 6-Mark Martin
 4-Ernie Irvan
 25-Ken Schrader
 15-Geoff Bodine
 17-Darrell Waltrip
 8-Sterling Marlin
 2-Rusty Wallace
 28-Davey Allison
 26-Brett Bodine

Dale Earnhardt becomes the first three time winner of this race. He only led the race's final two laps.
Richard Childress Racing also becomes the first team to win this race three times.

Coca-Cola 600 

The Coca-Cola 600 was held May 30 at Charlotte Motor Speedway. Ken Schrader won the pole.

Top ten results

 3-Dale Earnhardt
 24-Jeff Gordon
 18-Dale Jarrett
 25-Ken Schrader
 4-Ernie Irvan
 11-Bill Elliott
 12-Jimmy Spencer
 22-Bobby Labonte
 21-Morgan Shepherd, 1 lap down
 15-Geoff Bodine, 1 lap down

Failed to qualify: 85-Ken Bouchard, 48-James Hylton, 84-Rick Crawford, 38-Bobby Hamilton, 65-Jerry O'Neil, 49-Stanley Smith, 64-Johnny Chapman

 For the first time, the race was moved to a late afternoon start, and ended under the lights. The race was no longer to be held at the same time as the Indianapolis 500.
 Dale Earnhardt overcame two penalties (one for speeding on pit road, the other for wrecking Greg Sacks on a restart) to win his third Coca-Cola 600.
 First career top 10 for Bobby Labonte.

Budweiser 500 

The Budweiser 500 was held June 6 at Dover Downs International Speedway. Ernie Irvan won the pole, but totaled his car in final practice, being forced to go to a back-up car and having to start last.

Top ten results

 3-Dale Earnhardt
 18-Dale Jarrett
 28-Davey Allison
 6-Mark Martin
 25-Ken Schrader
 1-Rick Mast
 33-Harry Gant, 1 lap down
 12-Jimmy Spencer, 1 lap down
 21-Morgan Shepherd, 2 laps down
 38-Bobby Hamilton, 5 laps down

Failed to qualify: 80-Jimmy Horton, 56-Jerry Hill, 85-Ken Bouchard

Champion Spark Plug 500 

The Champion Spark Plug 500 was held June 13 at Pocono Raceway. Ken Schrader won the pole.

Top ten results

 42-Kyle Petty
 25-Ken Schrader
 33-Harry Gant
 12-Jimmy Spencer
 55-Ted Musgrave
 28-Davey Allison
 21-Morgan Shepherd
 8-Sterling Marlin
 5-Ricky Rudd
 11-Bill Elliott

Failed to qualify: 80-Jimmy Horton

 During the race, a fan later identified as Chad Blaine Kohl, darted onto the track as Kyle Petty and Davey Allison were battling for the lead; narrowly avoiding being hit. Kohl would eventually be charged with arson, risking a catastrophe, criminal mischief, disorderly conduct and public drunkenness.

Miller Genuine Draft 400 

The Miller Genuine Draft 400 was held June 20 at Michigan International Speedway. Brett Bodine won the pole.

Top ten results

 5-Ricky Rudd
 24-Jeff Gordon
 4-Ernie Irvan
 18-Dale Jarrett
 2-Rusty Wallace
 6-Mark Martin
 21-Morgan Shepherd
 8-Sterling Marlin
 11-Bill Elliott
 33-Harry Gant

Failed to qualify: 48-Trevor Boys, 81-Jeff Davis

Mark Martin ran out of fuel after 191 laps of 200, handing Ricky Rudd the lead, he would not run out of fuel and win.
This was Rudd's final victory for Hendrick Motorsports as he would leave the team at seasons end to form his own team with Tide sponsorship following him in following season.

Pepsi 400 

The Pepsi 400 was held July 3 at Daytona International Speedway. Ernie Irvan won the pole after Ken Schrader who had originally set the fastest time failed post-qualifying inspection due to an illegal carburetor designed to bypass the restrictor plate. Schrader was forced to start in last place.

Top ten results

 3-Dale Earnhardt
 8-Sterling Marlin
 25-Ken Schrader
 5-Ricky Rudd
 24-Jeff Gordon
 6-Mark Martin
 4-Ernie Irvan
 18-Dale Jarrett
 14-Terry Labonte
 55-Ted Musgrave

Failed to qualify: 45-Rich Bickle, 62-Clay Young, 29-Kerry Teague, 0-Delma Cowart, 31-Stan Fox, 49-Stanley Smith, 35-Bill Venturini, 65-Jerry O'Neil, 48-James Hylton, 73-Phil Barkdoll, 79-Andy Belmont, 77-Mike Potter, 86-Mark Thompson, 82-Mark Stahl, 83-Lake Speed, 85-Ken Bouchard, 89-Jim Sauter, 95-Jeremy Mayfield, 23-Eddie Bierschwale, 99-Brad Teague

This was Sterling Marlin's 9th 2nd place finish. He would finally break through with a victory in 1994.

Slick 50 300 

The inaugural Slick 50 300 was held on July 11 at New Hampshire International Speedway. Mark Martin won the pole.

Top ten results

 2-Rusty Wallace
 6-Mark Martin
 28-Davey Allison
 18-Dale Jarrett
 5-Ricky Rudd
 8-Sterling Marlin
 24-Jeff Gordon
 42-Kyle Petty, 1 lap down
 11-Bill Elliott, 1 lap down
 22-Bobby Labonte, 1 lap down

Failed to qualify: 62-Clay Young

Rusty Wallace's victory would be all the more impressive considering he started 33rd.
This was the last race for Davey Allison, who would die from injuries suffered in a helicopter accident two days later.
Jeff Burton and Joe Nemechek made their Winston Cup debuts in this race. Both would fall out before the halfway point (Burton would finish 37th, Nemechek would finish 36th).

Miller Genuine Draft 500 

The Miller Genuine Draft 500 was held July 18 at Pocono Raceway. Ken Schrader won the pole.

Top ten results

 3-Dale Earnhardt
 2-Rusty Wallace
 11-Bill Elliott
 21-Morgan Shepherd
 26-Brett Bodine
 25-Ken Schrader
 8-Sterling Marlin
 18-Dale Jarrett
 33-Harry Gant
 17-Darrell Waltrip

Failed to qualify: 52-Jimmy Means, 78-Jay Hedgecock, 56-Jerry Hill, 57-Bob Schacht
This was the first race after the death of Davey Allison. Out of respect, his team Robert Yates Racing did not enter the event with a replacement driver.

Bill Elliott, after having a disastrous 1993 to this point, gets his first top five finish of 1993.
After getting the victory, Dale Earnhardt would do a polish victory lap with a Davey Allison flag.
In his victory lane interview, Earnhardt said of Davey: "I'd run second to him in a heartbeat if it'd bring him back."

DieHard 500 

The DieHard 500 was held July 25 at Talladega Superspeedway. Bill Elliott won the pole.

Top ten results

 3-Dale Earnhardt
 4-Ernie Irvan
 6-Mark Martin
 42-Kyle Petty
 18-Dale Jarrett
 68-Greg Sacks
 21-Morgan Shepherd
 33-Harry Gant
 26-Brett Bodine
 16-Wally Dallenbach Jr.

Failed to qualify: 45-Rich Bickle, 38-Bobby Hamilton, 46-Buddy Baker, 62-Clay Young, 29-Kerry Teague

This race marked the first time the Robert Yates Racing #28 Havoline-Texaco car was entered following the death of Davey Allison, with Robby Gordon serving as a substitute driver. During the pre-race ceremonies; the invocation by the Rev. Hal Marchman was preceded by the reading of a poem by Davey Allison's widow Liz, while CBS ran a montage of Allison's life and career mixed with footage of Davey Allison's uncle Donnie driving the car around the track as the song "The Fans" by the group Alabama played in the background.
The race was marked by two major accidents: Stanley Smith suffered near-fatal head injuries in a lap 69 accident while Jimmy Horton flew over the wall in-between turns 1 and 2 and landed on an access road outside the track in the same crash. Later in the race, on lap 132, Neil Bonnett flew into the catch fence similar to the Bobby Allison crash in 1987 and just like the Allison crash required a lengthy red flag to repair the fence. That resulted in the introduction of roof flaps in 1994.
The margin of victory was 5 one-thousandths of a second (.005), setting a new record.
Race winner Dale Earnhardt who took his second consecutive victory again just like the previous race made a Polish Victory Lap with the #28 flag of Davey Allison on his memory, who died 12 days before.

Budweiser at The Glen 

The Budweiser at The Glen was held August 8 at Watkins Glen International. Mark Martin won the pole.

Top ten results

 6-Mark Martin
 16-Wally Dallenbach Jr.
 12-Jimmy Spencer
 11-Bill Elliott
 25-Ken Schrader
 8-Sterling Marlin
 22-Bobby Labonte
 9-P. J. Jones
 40-Kenny Wallace
 33-Harry Gant

Failed to qualify: 77-Davy Jones, 71-Dave Marcis, 81-Jeff Davis, 29-Kerry Teague, 65-Jerry O'Neil

Mark Martin won the pole and had the all-dominating car in the race.  However, problems in the pits at one point put him out of the top 20 in the race. Martin raced up through the field and inherited the lead with 5 laps to go when the two leaders, Kyle Petty and Dale Earnhardt, crashed in the esses.
This was Martin's first victory from the pole in his twenty-first attempt.
This was the second race in a row where the red flag stopped the race for an accident. This time it was due to Rick Mast's crash in turn 6 on lap 9, which required a lengthy guardrail repair. Mast was uninjured.

Champion Spark Plug 400 

The Champion Spark Plug 400 was held August 15 at Michigan International Speedway. Ken Schrader won the pole.

Top ten results

 6-Mark Martin
 21-Morgan Shepherd
 24-Jeff Gordon
 18-Dale Jarrett
 55-Ted Musgrave
 2-Rusty Wallace
 28-Lake Speed
 22-Bobby Labonte
 3-Dale Earnhardt
 11-Bill Elliott

Failed to qualify: 37-Loy Allen Jr., 48-James Hylton,
95-Jeremy Mayfield, 53-Richie Petty, 85-Ken Bouchard, 76-Ron Hornaday Jr., 62-Clay Young, 29-John Krebs, 81-Jeff Davis, 02-T. W. Taylor, 48-Andy Genzman

Andy Genzman may have made a second attempt in the James Hylton car.
This was Mark Martin's second consecutive victory.
This was the last time this race was sponsored by Champion Spark Plugs, a sponsorship that dates back to 1975.

Brickyard 400 test session 
A day after the Champion Spark Plug 400, the top 35 teams in the standings were invited to participate in an open test session for the 1994 Brickyard 400. On the way home from Michigan, the teams stopped at the Indianapolis Motor Speedway for two days of practice. Retired driver Richard Petty took a few fast laps on the second day, then donated the car to the Speedway museum.

Bud 500 

The Bud 500 was held August 28 at Bristol International Raceway. Mark Martin won the pole.

Top ten results

 6-Mark Martin
 2-Rusty Wallace
 3-Dale Earnhardt
 33-Harry Gant
 1-Rick Mast
 7-Jimmy Hensley
 26-Brett Bodine
 15-Geoff Bodine
 40-Kenny Wallace*, 1 lap down
 30-Michael Waltrip, 2 laps down

This was Mark Martin's third consecutive victory.
Dick Trickle relieved Wallace in his car. Wallace had broken his scapula during testing at Indianapolis Motor Speedway in preparation for next year's inaugural running of the Brickyard 400.
This was Ernie Irvan's final race in the #4 Kodak Chevrolet Lumina for Morgan-McClure Motorsports before leaving to drive the Robert Yates Racing #28 Havoline-Texaco Ford Thunderbird that had been driven by the late Davey Allison. Irvin would finish in 26th, completing only 316 of 500 laps due to engine failure.

Failed to qualify: 55-Ted Musgrave, 75-Todd Bodine, 9-P. J. Jones, 45-Rich Bickle

Mountain Dew Southern 500 

The Mountain Dew Southern 500 was held September 5 at Darlington Raceway. Ken Schrader won the pole. The race was shortened from 367 laps to 351 laps due to a lengthy rain delay and the track did not have lights, that would change in time for the race in 2004

Top ten results

 6-Mark Martin
 26-Brett Bodine
 2-Rusty Wallace
 3-Dale Earnhardt
 28-Ernie Irvan, 1 lap down
 5-Ricky Rudd, 1 lap down
 33-Harry Gant, 1 lap down
 21-Morgan Shepherd, 2 laps down
 25-Ken Schrader, 2 laps down
 40-Kenny Wallace, 3 laps down

Failed to qualify: 48-Trevor Boys, 56-Jerry Hill, 29-Jeff McClure

Ernie Irvan negotiated out of his contract with Morgan-McClure Motorsports in order to take over the #28 Ford for Robert Yates Racing to finish 5th in his first outing for the team.
This was Mark Martin's 4th consecutive victory, tying the Modern-era record for most consecutive victories.
The race was shortened by 15 laps. The start of the race had been delayed by more than 3 hours (the race started at 4 PM ET). As the race came towards the end, the teams were told on a restart with 25 laps to go that there would only be 10 laps remaining due to darkness, and due to this the race ended at approximately 7:30 PM ET.

Miller Genuine Draft 400 

The Miller Genuine Draft 400 was held September 11 at Richmond International Raceway. Bobby Labonte won the pole.

Top ten results

 2-Rusty Wallace
 11-Bill Elliott
 3-Dale Earnhardt
 5-Ricky Rudd
 26-Brett Bodine
 6-Mark Martin
 17-Darrell Waltrip
 14-Terry Labonte
 42-Kyle Petty
 24-Jeff Gordon

Failed to qualify: 80-Jimmy Horton, 45-Rich Bickle, 53-Richie Petty, 02-T. W. Taylor

SplitFire Spark Plug 500 

The SplitFire Spark Plug 500 was held September 19 at Dover Downs International Speedway. Rusty Wallace won the pole.

Top ten results

 2-Rusty Wallace
 25-Ken Schrader
 17-Darrell Waltrip
 18-Dale Jarrett
 33-Harry Gant
 12-Jimmy Spencer
 22-Bobby Labonte
 14-Terry Labonte
 21-Morgan Shepherd, 1 lap down
 11-Bill Elliott, 2 laps down

Failed to qualify: 48-Trevor Boys, 84-Norm Benning, 66-Mike Wallace, 02-T. W. Taylor, 9-P. J. Jones, 77-Mike Potter

 Among other driver changes, Geoff Bodine left Bud Moore Engineering after the previous race to drive for the #7 Ford team, a team that he had just purchased from the family of the late Alan Kulwicki.
 This race was mired with tire issues resulting in cut tires and 16 cautions for 103 of the 500 laps, and the average speed was 100.334 mph. The race took 4 hours and 59 minutes to complete.

Goody's 500 

The Goody's 500 was held September 26 at Martinsville Speedway. Ernie Irvan won the pole.

Top ten results

 28-Ernie Irvan
 2-Rusty Wallace
 12-Jimmy Spencer
 5-Ricky Rudd
 18-Dale Jarrett, 1 lap down
 26-Brett Bodine, 1 lap down
 14-Terry Labonte, 1 lap down
 30-Michael Waltrip, 1 lap down
 21-Morgan Shepherd, 2 laps down
 42-Kyle Petty, 2 laps down

Failed to qualify: 52-Jimmy Means

 This was Robert Yates Racing's first trip to victory lane since Davey Allison's death and the crew was reported to have had tears in their eyes as they went to victory lane.
 This was the last race with an entry list of less than 40 cars until the 2016 Folds of Honor QuikTrip 500, where only 39 cars entered. NASCAR limited race fields to a maximum of 40 cars starting with the 2016 season.

Tyson/Holly Farms 400 

The Tyson/Holly Farms 400 was held October 3 at North Wilkesboro Speedway. Ernie Irvan won the pole.

Top ten results

 2-Rusty Wallace
 3-Dale Earnhardt
 28-Ernie Irvan
 42-Kyle Petty
 5-Ricky Rudd, 1 lap down
 33-Harry Gant, 2 laps down
 14-Terry Labonte, 2 laps down
 1-Rick Mast, 3 laps down
 18-Dale Jarrett, 3 laps down
 25-Ken Schrader, 3 laps down

Failed to qualify: 52-Jimmy Means, 48-James Hylton, 68-Greg Sacks, 71-Dave Marcis, 45-Rich Bickle, 37-Loy Allen Jr.

This was the Billy Hagen team's final top 10 finish.
In a moment that no one driver wants to remember, Jeff Gordon sweeps last place (34th) at both North Wilkesboro races in 1993.

Mello Yello 500 

The Mello Yello 500 was held October 10 at Charlotte Motor Speedway. Jeff Gordon won his first career pole.

Top ten results

 28-Ernie Irvan
 6-Mark Martin
 3-Dale Earnhardt
 2-Rusty Wallace
 24-Jeff Gordon
 12-Jimmy Spencer
 42-Kyle Petty
 5-Ricky Rudd, 1 lap down
 25-Ken Schrader, 2 laps down
 11-Bill Elliott, 2 laps down

Failed to qualify: 71-Dave Marcis, 47-Billy Standridge, 37-Loy Allen Jr., 35-Bill Venturini, 63-Norm Benning, 99-Brad Teague, 83-Jeff McClure, 02-T. W. Taylor

Ernie Irvan flat out dominated this race leading 328 of the 334 laps (98.2%).
This would be the first race in NASCAR history that 2 sets of 3 brothers all competed against each other: The Wallace's (Rusty, Mike, & Kenny), and The Bodine's (Geoff, Brett, & Todd). The eldest brother of each set (Rusty & Geoff) finished ahead of the younger brothers. The Wallace's finished 4th (Rusty), 30th (Mike), &  35th (Kenny). The Bodine's finished 13th (Geoff), 15th (Brett), & 42nd/Last (Todd). All drivers but Todd saw the checkered flag and finished the race. Rusty was the only one to finish on the lead lap.
This was Rick Wilson's 200th career start. He would finish 32 laps down to the winner in 36th.
This was the final race Neil Bonnett called on TBS before his death at Daytona in February 1994.

AC Delco 500 

The AC Delco 500 was held October 24 at North Carolina Speedway. Mark Martin won the pole.

Top ten results

 2-Rusty Wallace
 3-Dale Earnhardt
 11-Bill Elliott
 33-Harry Gant
 6-Mark Martin, 1 lap down
 28-Ernie Irvan, 1 lap down
 17-Darrell Waltrip, 1 lap down
 25-Ken Schrader, 1 lap down
 41-Dick Trickle, 2 laps down
 7-Geoff Bodine, 2 laps down

Failed to qualify: 47-Billy Standridge, 63-Norm Benning, 65-Jerry O'Neil, 05-Ed Ferree
Last career top 5 for Harry Gant.
This was the final career start for Jimmy Means. He would complete 467 of 492 laps, finishing in 26th.

Slick 50 500 

The Slick 50 500 was held October 31 at Phoenix International Raceway. Bill Elliott won the pole.

Top ten results

 6-Mark Martin
 28-Ernie Irvan
 42-Kyle Petty
 3-Dale Earnhardt
 11-Bill Elliott
 5-Ricky Rudd
 17-Darrell Waltrip
 22-Bobby Labonte
 30-Michael Waltrip
 1-Rick Mast

Failed to qualify: 52-Scott Gaylord, 36-Butch Gilliland, 13-Stan Fox, 48-Jack Sellers, 81-Jeff Davis, 51-Rick Scribner

 This was the final Cup series race Neil Bonnett called on TNN before his death at Daytona in February 1994.

Hooters 500 
The Hooters 500 was held November 14 at Atlanta Motor Speedway. Harry Gant won the pole. 

Top ten results

 2-Rusty Wallace
 5-Ricky Rudd
 17-Darrell Waltrip
 11-Bill Elliott
 41-Dick Trickle
 30-Michael Waltrip
 18-Dale Jarrett
 55-Ted Musgrave
 75-Phil Parsons*
 3-Dale Earnhardt, 1 lap down

Failed to qualify: 47-Billy Standridge, 95-Jeremy Mayfield, 52-Jimmy Means, 62-Clay Young, 57-Bob Schacht, 72-John Andretti, 63-Norm Benning, 9-P. J. Jones, 84-Rick Crawford, 48-Andy Genzman

Dale Earnhardt won his sixth Winston Cup championship, needing only to finish in 34th place or better to score enough points to clinch the title; he finished 10th. On lap 117, enough cars had dropped out of the race to mathematically clinch the championship for Earnhardt. Rusty Wallace (the 1989 champion) gave the maximum effort in his 300th career Winston Cup start. Wallace led the most laps and won the race, his tenth win of the 1993 season. But it was not enough as he fell 80 points shy of Earnhardt, and wound up second in the championship to Earnhardt. 

Rusty Wallace became the first driver since Dale Earnhardt in 1987 to win ten or more Cup Series races in a single season. This would be the second time in Bob Latford's 1975 Winston Cup points system history, however, that a driver winning ten or more races in a season failed to win the championship.

This was Wallace's 31st and final victory driving a Pontiac, as he and Penske South Racing would switch to Ford in 1994. Pontiac left NASCAR at the end of 2003, and GM discontinued the Pontiac division in 2010. Wallace holds the NASCAR record for most wins by a Pontiac driver (the first 31 of his 55 career wins).

 During practice, Dale Earnhardt, Ken Schrader, and Jeff Gordon all had crashes. However, all three were uninjured and qualified for the race.

 This race was a day of remembrance, as mentioned in the television broadcast opening. Exactly a one-year prior, the 1992 race ended up being one of the greatest races of all time - and two of the key fixtures Alan Kulwicki and Davey Allison were killed in aviation accidents during the season.

 Neil Bonnett qualified for the race in a backup car (#31) for RCR, and executed one of the first start and park situations in NASCAR. The team arranged that Bonnett would climb out of the #31 car, at the last minute, in the event that Earnhardt's primary #3 car, after pre-race inspection, suffered mechanical failure on the grid or during the pace laps. If Earnhardt quickly hopped in and took the green flag to start the race in the #31 car, by rule, he would be awarded full points for that entry. The car Bonnett qualified was even prepared with Earnhardt's exact chassis set-ups. Earnhardt started his primary car (#3) without incident, and Bonnett pulled off the track to finish last after 3 laps. The team gave the reason of "engine failure". Bonnett's intentional "start and park" also helped maximize Earnhardt's finishing position, as only seven additional cars had to drop out for Earnhardt to mathematically clinch the title. RCR pulled out all the stops in preparation for this race. They brought a truck filled with extra spare parts, including an entire pre-assembled rear end and a framing machine to fix the car in case of a crash. This was also Bonnett's final ever NASCAR race he competed in before his death at Daytona in February 1994.

 Due to fog at the airport, several pit crew members on several teams were late arriving at the track. Darrell Waltrip started the race without his entire pit crew.

 Jeff Gordon secured the rookie of the year award, but in a mild surprise, he did not manage to win a points-paying race during the season.

 Todd Bodine, the contracted driver of car 75, was injured in the previous day's Busch Grand National race, so he was replaced for the race by Phil Parsons.

Final points standings 

(key) Bold - Pole position awarded by time. Italics - Pole position set by owner's points standings. *- Most laps led.

Rookie of the Year 
After his contract was bought from Bill Davis Racing, Jeff Gordon drove the #24 Hendrick Motorsports Chevy in 1993. He won one pole, had eleven top-tens and finished 14th in points. His next closest competitor was Bobby Labonte who had replaced Gordon at BDR. He had six top-tens and one pole, while third-place finisher Kenny Wallace had only three top-tens. The last place runner was P. J. Jones, who declared late in the season and only ran six races for Melling Racing.

See also
1993 NASCAR Busch Series

References

External links 
Winston Cup Standings and Statistics for 1993

 
NASCAR Cup Series seasons